Leon Kaiser (born 6 January 2000) is a German cross-country cyclist.

He participated at the 2018 UCI Mountain Bike World Championships, winning a medal.

References

External links

2000 births
Living people
German male cyclists